Miss International 1994, the 34th Miss International pageant, was held on September 4, 1994 at the Sun Arena in Ise, Mie, Japan. Christina Lekka earned Greece's first Miss International crown.

Results

Placements

Contestants

  - Alicia Andrea Ramón
  - Alexandra Ochoa Hincapié
  - Rebecca Anne Jackes
  - Kerstin Sattler
  - Maria Renée David
  - Ana Paula Barrotte
  - Amanda Louise Johnson
  - Alexandra Betancur Marín
  - Silvia Ester Muñoz Mata
  - Birgitte Brondum Jensen
  - Alexia Lockhart
  - Nathalia Gutiérrez Munguía
  - Sunita Devi
  - Marja Hannele Vuoristo
  - Nathalie Pereira
  - Viola Tuschardt
  - Christina Lekka
  - Nadine Theresa Gogue
  - Vivian Mariela Castañeda
  - Juliet Lokelani Kahikina Raymundo
  - Sabine Te Vrede
  - Dorothy Ng So-Shan
  - Francesca Marilynne Hart
  - Julie Alicia Stokes
  - Nitzan Kirshenboim
  - Tomomi Hanamura
  - Sung Hyun-ah
  - Sandy Wagner
  - Elaine Lanzon
  - Lilia Elizabeth Huesca Guajardo
  - Luisa Amalia Urcuyo Lacayo
  - Jamilla Haruna Danzuru
  - Mary Michelle Manibusan
  - Ann Wibeche Hoel
  - Dinorah Acevedo González
  - Jannyne Elena Peyrat Scolari
  - Alma Carvajal Concepcion
  - Ilona Felicjanska
  - Sónia Maria Marques Abel
  - Alice Marina Lee
  - Yelena Vitcheslavovna Gorbachova
  - Joycelyn Ching Ching Teo
  - Nikoleta Meszarosova
  - Carmen Maria Vicente Abellán
  - Sharmila Tamara Kariyawasam
  - Mirja Kristina Haglöf
  - Aysin Albayrak
  - Helen Vladimirovna Bakaeva
  - Karen Kristie Doyle
  - Milka "Yelisava" Chulina Urbanich

Did not compete
  - Priscilla Ruiz
  - Gloria Ondina Rivera
  - Lidia Ferrari

External links
 Pageantopolis - Miss International 1994

1994
1994 in Japan
1994 beauty pageants
Beauty pageants in Japan